Rainis Ruusamäe (8 September 1965 – 4 March 2020) is an Estonian politician. He was a member of IX Riigikogu.

He was born in Võru.

References

1965 births
2020 deaths
Social Democratic Party (Estonia) politicians
Members of the Riigikogu, 1999–2003
People from Võru